Samuel Edgar Langford (March 4, 1886 – January 12, 1956), known as the Boston Tar Baby, Boston Terror and Boston Bonecrusher, was a Black Canadian boxing standout of the early part of the 20th century. Called the "Greatest Fighter Nobody Knows", by ESPN, Langford is considered by many boxing historians to be one of the greatest fighters of all time. Originally from Weymouth Falls, a small community in Nova Scotia, he was known as "The Boston Bonecrusher", "The Boston Terror", and his most famous nickname, "The Boston Tar Baby". He fought from lightweight to heavyweight and defeated many world champions and legends of the time in each weight class. Considered a devastating puncher even at heavyweight, Langford was rated No. 2 by The Ring on their list of "100 greatest punchers of all time". One boxing historian described Langford as "experienced as a heavyweight James Toney with the punching power of Mike Tyson".

He was denied a shot at many World Championships, due to the colour bar and by the refusal of Jack Johnson, the first African-American World Heavyweight Champion, to fight him in a rematch. Langford was the World Colored Heavyweight Champion, a title vacated by Johnson after he won the World Championship, a record five times. Alongside this, Langford also defeated the reigning Lightweight Champion Joe Gans, the first African-American World Champion in boxing history and widely regarded as one of the greatest boxers of all time, in a non-title bout. Many boxing aficionados consider Langford to be the greatest boxer not to have won a world title. On August 13, 2020, the WBC granted Langford to be an honorary world champion. BoxRec ranks him as the 22nd greatest Canadian boxer of all time.

Early life
Born in Nova Scotia, his grandfather was a former slave from the USA who helped settle Weymouth Falls. Langford left home as a youth to escape an abusive father. He made his way to Boston where he eventually found work as a janitor in a boxing gymnasium at the Lenox Athletic Club. Not long after he started working he was sparring and improving his own boxing skills. He won the amateur featherweight championship of Boston at age 15.

Professional career 

Langford was a boxer who fought greats from the lightweight division right up to the heavyweights, beating many champions in the process. However, he was never able to secure a world title for himself. Despite the fact, Langford never received a chance to fight for Jack Johnson's heavyweight title,  Ring magazine founder Nat Fleischer rated Langford as one of the ten best heavyweights of all time. Renowned champion Jack Dempsey claimed that as a young boxer in 1916 he refused a fight with Langford.  According to Dempsey: "I think Sam Langford was the greatest fighter we ever had."

Significant fights 

Langford's most memorable fights were his numerous encounters against fellow black boxers Sam McVey, Battling Jim Johnson, Joe Jeanette and Harry Wills, who all experienced similar barriers in their fighting careers.

Langford defeated World Lightweight Champion Joe Gans on December 8, 1903, via a 15-round decision. Gans' title was not on the line, however. The two would later become good friends. Langford considered Gans the pound-for-pound greatest fighter of all time.

He fought Jack Blackburn, trainer of the legendary Joe Louis, six times. The first three fights were draws, the fourth a decision win for Langford, the fifth another draw and the sixth a no contest.

Although Langford is often credited as the greatest fighter to never challenge for a world title, he fought World Welterweight Champion Barbados Joe Walcott on September 5, 1904, for his title. The fight resulted in a draw via decision, thus Walcott retained his title. However, reports of the fight say Langford clearly outpointed the champion. Langford kept Walcott at a distance with his longer reach and used his footwork to evade all of Walcott's attacks. Langford landed lefts and rights to the jaw so effectively, Walcott was bleeding by round two and continued bleeding more after every round. Walcott was brought on one knee in the third round and the fight ended with hardly a scratch on Langford.

In 1912, Langford was one of the contenders for the World Colored Heavyweight Championship fought at various venues across Australia. Sam McVey his opponent, McVey ranked alongside Jack Johnson, Joe Jeanette, Sam Langford, and Harry Wills as the top black heavyweights of their generation. Prior to his win, Langford stayed at the Nedlands Park Hotel where he:

Langford fought various contenders throughout his career. He fought welterweight Young Peter Jackson six times, winning the first two by decision, the third was a draw via points, losing the fourth by technical knockout and winning the fifth and sixth bouts again by decision. Their bout on November 12, 1907, at the Pacific Athletic Club in Los Angeles was billed as being for the World Colored Middleweight Championship (158  lbs.). Langford won the title by besting Jackson on points in the 20-round bout.

Langford fought heavyweight Joe Jeanette fourteen times, losing the first by eighth-round retirement, winning second by decision, third and fourth were a draw via points, winning the fifth through eighth by decision, ninth was a draw via points, winning the tenth on the decision, eleventh was a draw via points, lost the twelfth by decision and winning the thirteenth by seventh-round knock out and fourteenth by decision (Total: 8 wins (1 KO), 2 losses (1 RT and 1 PTS) and 4 draws).

He fought future World Heavyweight Champion Jack Johnson on April 26, 1906, losing by a fifteenth-round decision. Johnson was 29 pounds heavier than Langford. Langford took severe punishment and was knocked down 3 times; however, he lasted the 15 round distance. After winning their first match, Johnson repeatedly refused rematches against Langford, who was considered by some to be the most dangerous challenger for Johnson's crown, although Johnson cited Langford's inability to meet his $30,000 appearance fee.

Langford fought heavyweight Fireman Jim Flynn six times, winning the first by first-round knockout, losing the second by decision, winning the third by eighth-round knockout, winning the fourth by decision, winning the fifth by third-round knockout, and winning the sixth by decision.

Winner of the World Colored Middleweight Championship in 1907 when he beat Young Peter Jackson, he fought World Middleweight Champion Stanley Ketchel on April 27, 1910 in a six round non-title fight, a no-decision draw. A longer rematch bout was rumoured but never happened due to Ketchell's murder six months later.

Langford fought heavyweight Battling Jim Johnson twelve times, winning the first three by decision, fourth and fifth were a draw via points, winning the sixth and seventh on points, eighth by twelfth-round knockout, ninth through eleventh by points, and drawing in the twelfth via points (Total: 9 wins (1 KO), 0 losses and 3 draws). Johnson was always heavier than Langford by 26–40 pounds.

Langford fought heavyweight Sam McVea fifteen times, drawing in the first via points, losing the second by decision, winning the third and fourth by decision, winning the fifth by technical knockout (McVea claimed a foul; this was not allowed and he refused to continue), winning the sixth by thirteenth-round knockout, seventh was a draw via points, losing the eighth by decision, ninth through eleventh were draws via points, winning the twelfth by decision, thirteenth and fourteenth were draws via decision and winning the fifteenth by decision (Total: 6 wins (2 KO), 2 losses (0 KO) and 7 draws). Langford was 37 years old in the final bout.

Langford defeated former World Light Heavyweight Champion Philadelphia Jack O'Brien on August 15, 1911, by fifth-round technical knockout. Langford outweighed O'Brien by ten pounds. The fight was stopped after a hard left hook put O'Brien on the canvas. O'Brien had to be helped to his corner. The poetic O'Brien later said of Langford, "When he appeared upon the scene of combat, you knew you were cooked."

Langford fought heavyweight Gunboat Smith twice, losing the first by decision (many ring siders were surprised) and winning the second by third-round knockout.

Langford fought heavyweight Harry Wills seventeen times. Langford was 31 in the first bout and continued to suffer from old age and failing eyesight more and more each fight. The first was a draw via points, the second a win via fourteenth-round knockout, the third and fourth losses via decision, the fifth a win via nineteenth-round knockout, the sixth through ninth losses via decision, the tenth a draw via points, the eleventh a loss via sixth-round knockout and the twelfth by seventh-round technical knockout, the thirteenth through seventeenth by decision (Total: 2 wins (2 KO), 14 losses (2 KO) and 2 draws).

Former World Heavyweight Champion Tommy Burns was a referee in the third fight. At the end, he caught Langford's hand and said to him, "Sam, this is the hardest I ever had to do in my life. I always admired you and never thought to see you beaten, but I have to give the decision against you."

World Welterweight title fight 
Although Langford is often credited as the greatest fighter to never challenge for a world title, he fought World Welterweight Champion Barbados Joe Walcott, a black man, on September 5, 1904, at Lake Massabesic Coliseum in Manchester, New Hampshire for his title. Both fighters weighed in at 142 lbs.

The fight resulted in a draw via decision, thus Walcott retained his title. However, reports of the fight say Langford clearly outpointed the champion. Langford kept Walcott at a distance with his longer reach and used his footwork to evade all of Walcott's attacks. Langford landed lefts and rights to the jaw so effectively, Walcott was bleeding by round two and continued bleeding more after every round. Walcott was brought on one knee in the third round and the fight ended with hardly a scratch on Langford.

The Lowell Sun newspaper reported:

 "Joe Walcott met his match in a 15-round bout yesterday afternoon in the Massabasic coliseum before a crowd of 1200. His opponent was Sam Langford, who clearly outpointed the champion, and the latter's aggressiveness in carrying the fight to Langford was all that saved him from making a decision that would have given him the short end of the purse. Langford took advantage of his longer reach and repeatedly played a tattoo on Walcott's face, and his cleverness on his feet carried him away from (unreadable) a score or more times when Walcott endeavored by sheer brute force to deliver a knockout blow. While Walcott was the aggressor, Langford met his attacks by rights and lefts to the jaw and mouth so effectively as to draw blood in the second round and he kept Walcott bleeding in every round thereafter. In the third round, Langford brought the champion to one knee by a straight-away jolt to the jaw, and he went through the entire fifteen rounds without a perceptible scratch on himself. In the opening round honors were even, but thereafter until the seventh round Langford had all the better of the argument."

World Colored Heavyweight Championship 
Sam Langford won the World Colored Heavyweight Championship a record five times between 1910 and 1918. Jack Johnson had reigned as the World Colored Heavyweight Champion from 1903 to 1908, when he relinquished the title after winning the World Heavyweight Championship. Joe Jeanette and Sam McVey fought in Paris in February 1909 to fill the vacant title, with McVey the victor. Jeanette took the title away from McVey two months later.

Subsequently, Langford claimed the title during Jeanette's reign after Johnson refused to defend the World Heavyweight Championship against him. For a year there were two dueling claimants to the world coloured heavyweight crown, Jeanette, the "official" champ, and Langford, the pretender, the man whom Jack Johnson "ducked". On September 6, 1910, in Boston, Massachusetts, Langford became the undisputed coloured champ by winning a 15-round bout with Jeanette on points. Still, Jack Johnson refused to give him a title shot.

Failure to secure title shot 
Langford had lost to Jack Johnson the only time they had fought, on April 26, 1906, in a fifteen-round decision. Johnson was 29  lbs. heavier than Langford, and though he knocked down Langford in the sixth round, many spectators felt Langford had won the bout, even though Sam was on the verge of going down several times only for Johnson to hold him up and prevent a knockdown. In truth, Johnson actually toyed with him, carrying on conversations with ringsiders all through the fight. After winning their first match, Johnson repeatedly refused rematches against Langford, who was considered by some to be the most dangerous challenger for Johnson's crown. Another explanation for this Johnson's refusal is that he knew that a fight between two black fighters would not generate nearly as much revenue as a fight between him and a white man.

Battling Jim Johnson, the man Sam fought twelve times, beating Johnson nine times and never losing once, would be the one who got the title shot against Johnson that Langford had rightly believed his.

World Heavyweight Championship 
Ironically, the color bar that had marred the world heavyweight title by blackballing boxers of color remained in force even under Jack Johnson. Once he was the World's Heavyweight Champion, Johnson did not fight a black opponent for the first five years of his reign. In addition to Langford, he denied matches to black heavyweights Joe Jeanette and to the young Harry Wills (who was Colored Heavyweight Champion during the last year of Johnson's reign as World Heavyweight Champion).

Blacks were not given a shot at the title allegedly because Johnson felt that he could make more money fighting white boxers. In August 1913, as Johnson neared the end of his troubled reign as World Heavyweight Champion, there were rumours that he had agreed to fight Langford in Paris for the title, but it came to naught. Johnson claimed that Langford was unable to raise $30,000 (equivalent to approximately $ in today's funds) for his guarantee.

Because black boxers with the exception of Johnson had been barred from fighting for the heavyweight championship because of racism, Johnson's refusal to fight African-Americans offended the African-American community, since the opportunity to fight top white boxers was rare. Jeanette criticized Johnson, saying, "Jack forgot about his old friends after he became champion and drew the color line against his own people."

When Johnson finally did agree to take on a black opponent in late 1913, it was not Sam Langford, the current Colored Heavyweight Champion, that he gave the title shot to. Instead, Johnson chose Battling Jim Johnson, a mediocrity who, in 1910, had lost to Langford and had a draw and loss via knockout to Sam McVey, another former Colored Champion. Battling Jim fought fellow former Colored Champion Joe Jeanette four times between July 19, 1912, and January 21, 1912, and lost all four fights. The only fighter of note he did beat in that period was future Colored Champion Big Bill Tate, whom he knocked out in the second round of a scheduled 10-round bout. It was Tate's third pro fight.

The fight, scheduled for 10 rounds, was held on December 19, 1913, in Paris. It was the first time in history that two blacks had fought for the World Heavyweight Championship. While the Johnson v. Johnson fight had been billed as a World Heavyweight title match, in many ways, it resembled an exhibition. A sportswriter from the Indianapolis Star reported that the fight crowd became unruly when it was apparent that neither boxer was putting up a fight." The champ barely engaged Battling Jim, and it turned out he had broken his arm during the third round, a distinct disadvantage that Battling Jim failed to capitalize on. The fight was a draw, and Jack Johnson kept his championship.

Battling Jim's next fight, four months later, also was a title match. On March 27, 1914, in New York City, Sam Langford won a newspaper decision in a ten-rounder with Johnson. According to the New York Times, the coloured champ "won by a wide margin" because Johnson "failed to show anything remotely resembling championship ability."

Battling Jim fought Langford ten more times (including two more coloured title matches). Two of the fights were draws, including their last fight on September 22, 1918, which was also Battling Jim's last pro bout. He faced Joe Jeanette five more times and did not win a single contest. Two of their fights were draws and their last fight on August 20, 1918, Battling Jim's penultimate pro fight, was a no-decision.
 
Of the other former and future Colored Heavyweight Champions that Battling Jim battled, he won only one fight, against Harry Wills, because he broke his wrist blocking a punch in a non-title match and Johnson won by a technical knockout. Battling Jim lost his other two fights with Wills and lost all of the five fights he had with ex-champ Sam McVey in the post-Jack Johnson title shot period.

Battling Jim, who died during Spanish influenza epidemic of 1918, ended with a career record of 30 wins against 31 losses and six draws when his newspaper decisions are factored in. Looking at his dismal performance with the top black heavyweights of his era and his inability to best a one-armed Jack Johnson, Battling Jim Johnson cannot be considered a top contender of his era or a worthy opponent when Jack awarded him the sole title shot given to a black heavyweight from 1908 to 1937. Fittingly, he was scheduled to fight Langford before he died.

In 1915, Jack Johnson lost his title to Jess Willard, the last in a long line of Great White Hopes. Because of the animosity he had generated combined with the virulent racism of the period, it would be 22 years before another African American, Joe Louis, was given a shot at the Heavyweight title.

When it was in his power to give an African American a title shot, Jack Johnson refused to grant that privilege to Sam Langford, the fighter who after former champ Jim Jeffries (a man Langford said he would not face when Jeff was in the prime of his career), had to be considered the No. 1 contender in the heavyweight division. Johnson beat Jeffries but ducked Langford, likely as he feared losing his title. Many people consider the failure of Langford to secure a shot at the Heavyweight title one of the greatest injustices of American sports.

Later career 
Langford fought heavyweight Fred Fulton twice, losing the first by seventh-round technical knockout and the second by a four-round decision. Langford was 34 and 35 in each respective fight. Langford was much heavier, yet much shorter than Fulton.

On June 5, 1922, Langford knocked out Tiger Flowers in only the second round. Langford was mostly blind and Flowers would soon afterwards win the World Middleweight Championship.

In 1923, Sam Langford fought and won Boxing's last "fight to the finish" for the Mexican Heavyweight title.

His last fight was in 1926, when his failing eyesight finally forced him to retire. Langford was 43 years old and completely blind.

Films exist of Langford fighting Fireman Jim Flynn and Bill Lang.

One story characterizing his career involved Langford in a bout where he had been ordered not to throw any knockout punches until after the 7th round. So walking out for the 8th round, after 21 minutes of patting away, Langford touched gloves with his opponent. "What's the matter, Sam, it ain't the last round!" said his mystified opponent. "Tis for you son," said Langford, who promptly knocked his opponent out. Another story involves Langford at a fight where just before it began he apologized to the audience and said he would have to make it a quick fight as he had a train to catch very soon. He then knocked out his opponent within the first round, apologized to the audience once again, and left, just in time to catch his train.

Life after boxing 
Langford eventually went completely blind and ended up penniless, living in Harlem, New York City. In 1944, a newspaper column was published about his plight after which close to $10,000.00 was donated by fans to help Langford. The column was titled "A Dark Man Laughs" and it was written by Al Laney of the New York Herald Tribune. Eventually, funding was obtained to pay for successful eye surgery. Langford was enshrined in the Ring Boxing Hall of Fame and Canada's Sports Hall of Fame in 1955. He died a year later in Cambridge, Massachusetts, where he had been living in a private nursing home.

In 1999, Langford was voted Nova Scotia's top male athlete of the 20th century.

In 2013, the jazz trio Tarbaby released a CD entitled "Ballad of Sam Langford".

In 2018 Langford was ranked fifth in a selection of the greatest 15 athletes in Nova Scotia's history.

Professional boxing record
All information in this section is derived from BoxRec, unless otherwise stated.

Official record

All newspaper decisions are officially regarded as “no decision” bouts and are not counted in the win/loss/draw column.

Unofficial record

Record with the inclusion of newspaper decisions in the win/loss/draw column.

References

Further reading
 Laffoley, Steven (2013). Pulling No Punches: The Sam Langford Story. Pottersfield Press.

External links 

Sam Langford: The 300 Bout Man – Fightfanatics.com
Sam's Family Tree
Cyber Boxing Zone

Profile on Langford by Monte Cox
Image of Sam Langford in the corner of a ring between 2 staff members. Los Angeles Times Photographic Archive (Collection 1429). UCLA Library Special Collections, Charles E. Young Research Library, University of California, Los Angeles.

|-

1880s births
1956 deaths
Canadian people of Black Nova Scotian descent
Black Canadian boxers
Heavyweight boxers
World colored heavyweight boxing champions
World colored middleweight boxing champions
Sportspeople from Nova Scotia
People from Digby County, Nova Scotia
Boxers from Boston
Canadian expatriate sportspeople in the United States
Persons of National Historic Significance (Canada)
Canadian male boxers
International Boxing Hall of Fame inductees